Otto Gildemeister (13 March 1823 Bremen - 26 August 1902) was a German journalist and translator.

Biography
In 1850 he became editor-in-chief of the Weser-Zeitung of Bremen. He is known for his German renderings of Byron's complete works (1864–65; 4th ed. 1888); of a number of plays of Shakespeare, including the historical ones, for the Bodenstedt edition; of Shakespeare's Sonnets (1871); Ariosto's Orlando Furioso (4 vols., 1882); and Dante's Divina Commedia (1888; 3d ed. 1900).

Family
He was the brother of German architect Karl Gildemeister.

Notes

References

1823 births
1902 deaths
German journalists
German male journalists
English–German translators
Writers from Bremen
19th-century German translators
19th-century German writers
19th-century German male writers